Huang Minghao (born February 19, 2002), known professionally as Justin, is a Chinese singer, dancer, rapper, actor and host. He was a member of project group Nine Percent from April 6, 2018 to the group's disbandment on October 6, 2019, and is currently a member of Yuehua's NEXT.

Early life
Born on 19 February 2002, in Rui’an, Wenzhou, Zhejiang province, Huang lived with his grandparents and attended Hangzhou Jinxiu Middle School before becoming a trainee at Yuehua Entertainment and flying to South Korea at age thirteen to commence training.

Career

Pre-debut: Produce 101 and Idol Producer

Huang participated in the South Korean boy group survival reality show, Produce 101 which aired on Mnet in 2017. Performed stages such as "Sister is so beautiful" and "Shape of You", and took the center position on the stage of "Sister is so beautiful".He was eventually eliminated on episode 8 with a total votes of 458,650. It was later announced in late 2017 that Justin will be joining the Chinese boy band reality series, Idol Producer.

2018-present: Debut with Nine Percent, NEXT and solo activities

Huang then returned to China to develop his career and succeeded after joining Idol Producer aired from January 19 to April 6, 2018. In the finals, he ranked fourth with 14,574,594 votes and officially debuted as a member of the nine-member boy group Nine Percent.

While promoting with Nine Percent, Huang debuted as a member of Yuehua's new boy band NEXT with the song "Wait a Minute" on June 21, 2018. On June 23, 2018, Huang and other members of NEXT held their first fan meeting in Beijing, China.On November 5, 2018，the first solo original single "Hard Road" was released.On December 7, 2018，the second solo original song "After Leaving" was released.On April 23, 2019, the third solo original single "Liar" was released. On May 15th,2019， they teamed up with Japanese Rapper - KOHH to bring a new collaborative single "Maria".

In early 2019, Huang joined the cast of Great Escape alongside artists like Yang Mi, Deng Lun and more. On November 8, 2019, Huang and five other members of NEXT released the album “Next Begins”. During the summer, Huang became a coach-in-training in the variety show “24 Seconds of Youth” and in the fall, he became part of the cast of “Meeting the Temple of Heaven”

As of 2020, Huang has become a fixed member of the variety shows “I Want to Open a Shop” and “The Great Wall.” He has said in an interview that he plans to release his new solo album around the time of his birthday. In January 2020, it was announced that he would be joining the cast of 七圣, starring as 哪吒. On August 3, 2020, Huang released his first solo album "18".

On October 15, 2021, he will participate in "A Wonderful Night on Douyin"; on December 31, he will participate in "Dream of the East 2022 Dragon TV New Year's Eve".

Discography

Extended plays

Singles

Collaborations

Filmography

Film

Television shows

Magazine

Awards and nominations

Notes

References

2002 births
Living people
People from Rui'an
Produce 101 contestants
Idol Producer contestants
Nine Percent members
Singers from Zhejiang
21st-century Chinese male singers
21st-century Chinese male actors
Chinese male dancers
Chinese male film actors